The Lom people or , also known in  as (Bosha or Posha) by non-Loms or Romani or Caucasian Romani,, are an ethnic group originating from India.
Their Lomavren language is a mixed language, combining an Indo-Aryan substrate with Armenian.

Number

The exact number of existing Bosha is difficult to determine, due to the dispersed and often mostly-assimilated nature of the group. Estimates suggest only a few thousand of the people can be found across Armenia and Georgia, while the Armenian Government's census reports only 50 living in the former.

Distribution
Concentrations of Bosha can be found in Yerevan and Gyumri in Armenia. Some of the Bosha in Armenia have adopted the Armenian language and assimilated with the larger Armenian population.

In Georgia they live in such cities as Tbilisi, Kutaisi, Akhalkalaki and Akhaltsikhe. They are noted for such occupations as sievemakers. 

In Turkey the Lomlar or Poshalar adopted Islam at the 19th century and assimilated Turkish culture. They mostly live in Artvin, Rize, Ardahan and Kars and identify themselves as Meshketian Turks, hiding their Lom origins, while taking Armenian words from their contact with the Hemshin.

References

External links

Marushiakova, Elena and Vesselin Popov. 2016. Gypsies of Central Asia and Caucasus. London: Palgrave Macmillan. 
Roma and Gypsies

Ethnic groups in Armenia
Ethnic groups in Georgia (country)
Ethnic groups in Turkey